The 1979–80 Honduran Liga Nacional season was the 14th edition of the Honduran Liga Nacional.  The format of the tournament remained the same as the previous season.  C.D. Marathón won the title after defeating Universidad in the finals.  Both teams qualified to the 1980 CONCACAF Champions' Cup.  Additionally, Marathón, Universidad, C.D. Broncos and C.D. Victoria obtained berths to the 1980 Copa Fraternidad.

1979–80 teams

 Broncos (Choluteca)
 Marathón (San Pedro Sula)
 Motagua (Tegucigalpa)
 Olimpia (Tegucigalpa)
 Platense (Puerto Cortés)
 Portuario (Puerto Cortés, promoted)
 Real España (San Pedro Sula)
 Universidad (Tegucigalpa)
 Victoria (La Ceiba)
 Vida (La Ceiba)

Regular season

Standings

Fifth place playoff

Final round

Pentagonal standings

Final

Top scorer
  Prudencio "Tecate" Norales (Olimpia) with 15 goals

Squads

Known results

Round 1

Pentagonal

Unknown rounds

Curiosities
On 8 April 1979, Real C.D. España played two games.  They lost 1–0 against Universidad at Tegucigalpa in the domestic league and 1–0 against Aurora in Guatemala for the 1979 Copa Fraternidad finals.

References

Liga Nacional de Fútbol Profesional de Honduras seasons
1
Honduras